These are tables of congressional delegations from Mississippi to the United States House of Representatives and the United States Senate.

The current dean of the Mississippi delegation is Representative Bennie Thompson (MS-2), having served in the House since 1993.

United States Senate

U.S. House of Representatives

Current members
List of members, their terms in office, district boundaries, and the district political ratings according to the CPVI. The delegation has 4 members: 3 Republicans and 1 Democrat.

Mississippi Territory
On April 7, 1798, the Mississippi Territory was created. Starting in 1801, the Territory sent one non-voting delegate to the U.S. House of Representatives.

State of Mississippi
On December 10, 1817, Mississippi was admitted into the Union as a state and sent one Representative to Congress, elected at-large statewide. After the 1830 census, Mississippi had two seats, elected statewide at-large on a general ticket. Starting in 1843, Mississippi's delegation was increased to four seats, still elected at-large statewide on a general ticket. After 1847, those seats were elected by representative districts. After the 1850 census, Mississippi gained a 5th seat. For the 33rd Congress, that fifth seat was elected at-large. Starting with the 34th Congress, the new seat was apportioned as a fifth district.

1817–1847: at-large elections

1847–1853: 4 seats

1853–1873: 5 seats

1873–1883: 6 seats

1883–1903: 7 seats

1903–1953: 8, then 7 seats

1953–1963: 6 seats

1963–present: 5, then 4 seats

Key

See also

List of United States congressional districts
Mississippi's congressional districts
Political party strength in Mississippi

References 

 
 
Mississippi
Politics of Mississippi
Congressional delegations